Bhima borneana is a species of moth of the family Lasiocampidae first described by Jeremy Daniel Holloway in 1987. It is found on Borneo. The wing markings are dull, ochreous, pale brown,  rather than grey, also the thorax; the pale area of the hindwing is more extensive.

The wingspan is 25–27 mm.

References

External links

Lasiocampidae
Moths described in 1987